Robin Bennett (born 6 November 1934) was Archdeacon of Dudley from 1985 until 1986.
 
Bennett was educated at Northgate Grammar School, Ipswich and St John's College, Durham; and ordained in 1961. After curacies and incumbencies in Essex and East London he was Principal of the Aston Training Scheme from 1977.  He left the Church of England in 1988 to join the Society of Friends.  He was Principal of  Wandsworth Adult College from 1989 to 1995.

References

People educated at Northgate Grammar School, Ipswich
Alumni of St John's College, Durham
1934 births
Living people
Archdeacons of Dudley
English Quakers
Converts to Quakerism